Wear is a surname. Notanle people with the name include:

 Arthur Wear (1880-1918), American tennis player
 David Wear (born 1990), American basketball player
 Joseph Wear (1876-1941), American tennis player
 Maud Marian Wear (1873–1955), English artist
 Peter Wear (born 1949), Australian journalist
 Sylvanus Wear (1858-1920), English naturalist
 Travis Wear (born 1990), American basketball player

See also
Ware (surname)